Junglee is a 2009 Indian Kannada language romantic action film written and directed by Soori, and produced by Rockline Venkatesh. It stars Duniya Vijay, Aindrita Ray, Rangayana Raghu, Balu Nagendra and Adi Lokesh.

Deepu. S. Kumar won the Karnataka State Film Award for Best Editor (2008–09) for the film.

Cast 
 Duniya Vijay as Junglee Prabhakar
 Andritha Ray as Padma
 Rangayana Raghu as Gudde Narasimha
 Balu Nagendra as Krishna
 Adi Lokesh
 Suresh Chandra as Guruswamy 
 Megha Bhagavatar
 Sanketh Kashi as Padma's father
 Jaidev Mohan as Jumki
 Naveen
Shobaraj in a cameo appearance 
Bhaskar Surya 
Anil Kumar 
Raghava Uday 
Vijaya Sarathi 
Arasu Maharaj 
Nanjunda as Malli, Guruswamy's rival
Ravi Santhehaklu  
Manjunath S. T.  
Lalithamma 
Vikram Mor  
Vinod  
Chinnayya  
Yathiraj as a police constable 
Rachana Mourya- cameo appearance in the song "Ee Majavada Moggu"

Soundtrack

Reception

Critical response 

R G Vijayasarathy of Rediff gave 2 out of 5 stars and wrote "Rangayana Raghu in such roles before. Aadi Lokesh has nothing much to do in the villain's role. Nanjunda and Sureshchandra are good in their respective roles. All in all, Junglee is an ordinary film from Soori's stable. Watch it only for Andrita, Hari Krishna and Sathya Hegde."

The Times of India  gave 2.5 out of 5 stars and wrote "Vijay is a treat to watch for his brilliant action and emotional sequences. Andritha is okay. Adi Lokesh is impressive. Sathya Hegde's camerawork is brilliant. V Harikrishna has given a couple of foot-tapping numbers with which choreographer Imran Sadaria has done a neat job."

Sify wrote "V Harikrishna. Two other songs are well tuned. Satya Hegde would be a contestant for award from this film. He continues to play with dark and light shades sometimes giving Sophia color to the shots. Action lovers will not be disappointed." Bangalore Mirror wrote "Suri it seems, gathers all his information from watching films in bars. So, there are more than a dozen references to scenes from other films and when not carrying a gun or sword, the characters hold glasses or bottles in their hands."

References

External links
 

2009 films
2000s Kannada-language films
Indian action films
Films scored by V. Harikrishna
Rockline Entertainments films
Films directed by Duniya Soori
2009 action films